The ITL MARS (Multi-purpose Aiming Reflex Sight) is a gun sight that combines two sighting devices, a reflex sight and a laser sight, as well as a backup iron sight. It is designed and produced by ITL Optronics company, based in Israel. The laser may be either visible or infrared and can be activated as need via a pressure switch. It has been purchased by a number of forces including the U.S. military for its M16 series weapons, Israel for its IMI Tavor TAR-21 rifle, and India (locally manufactured under license as raptor sight) for its INSAS rifle, as well as other commercial customers. 

Optics & Sensors:

See also
 Aimpoint AB
 Trijicon
 Elcan
 EOTech

External links

 ITL Mars brochure 

Firearm sights
United States Marine Corps equipment
Military equipment introduced in the 2000s